Meatsuit is the debut studio album of Fallingice, released on 16 July 2010 via Ukdivision Records. In November 2010 it was also distributed and promoted in Benelux (Belgium, Netherlands and Luxembourg) by Roadrunner Records Belgium. Some songs were recorded at the beginning of 2000-s.

Track listing

"Unclear" (4:05)
"Another Day" (2:52)
"Inner Confusion" (4:00)
"Soap Bubble" (4:14)
"Breathing Machine" (3:31)
"Hands In Chains" (5:15)
"Desired" (4:53)
"Teenage Boy" (3:27)
"Memories" (5:15)
"Too Bored To Die" (4:56)
"My Cold Heart" (4:22)

Personnel
 Produced by Alessandro Paolucci and Fallingice
 Recorded by Alessandro Sportelli and Alessandro Paolucci at West Link Recordings, Pisa, Italy
Except vocals recorded by David Lenci and Mano Moccia at Red House Recordings, Senigallia, Italy
 Mixed by David Lenci at Red House Recordings, Senigallia.
 Mastered by Tom Baker at Precision Mastering, Hollywood.
 Artwork by Bem Calavera
 Album photography by Leonardo Rinaldesi
 A&R: Carlo Bellotti

References

2010 albums